There are over 9,000 Grade I listed buildings in England. This page is a list of these buildings in the Cotswold district in Gloucestershire.

List of buildings

|}

See also
 Grade I listed buildings in Gloucestershire
 Grade I listed buildings in Cheltenham
 Grade I listed buildings in Forest of Dean
 Grade I listed buildings in Gloucester
 Grade I listed buildings in South Gloucestershire
 Grade I listed buildings in Stroud (district)
 Grade I listed buildings in Tewkesbury (borough)
 Grade II* listed buildings in Cotswold (district)

Notes

References 
National Heritage List for England

External links

Cotswold
Cotswold